Ilya Lobanov (born 1 December 1996) is a Kazakhstani ice hockey defenceman playing for Barys Astana of the Kontinental Hockey League.

References

External links

1996 births
Living people
People from Kostanay Region
Kazakhstani ice hockey defencemen
Barys Nur-Sultan players